José Bispo Clementino dos Santos (May 12, 1913 – June 14, 2008) was a Brazilian samba singer known as Jamelão. He began in music as a tamborim player, but later became known as the official singer at samba school Mangueira's carnival parades, performing in every Carnival from 1949 to 2006. He also toured Europe as a solo performer.

He's considered to be the best singer of Lupicinio Rodrigues songs. He recorded in 1972 the album Jamelão Interpreta Lupicinio.

He died on June 14, 2008, of multiple organ failure.

References

External links
"Papo de Samba" (Brazilian site) 

1913 births
2008 deaths
20th-century Brazilian male singers
20th-century Brazilian singers
Deaths from multiple organ failure
Samba musicians
Rio Carnival